Events in the year 1634 in the Spanish Netherlands and Prince-bishopric of Liège (predecessor states of the nation of Belgium).

Incumbents

Habsburg Netherlands
Monarch – Philip IV, King of Spain and Duke of Brabant, of Luxembourg, etc.

Governor General – Marquis of Aytona to 4 November; thereafter Cardinal-Infante Ferdinand of Austria

Prince-Bishopric of Liège
Prince-Bishop – Ferdinand of Bavaria

Events
March
13 March – Great Council of Mechelen sentences Henry, Count of Bergh, in absentia to death and forfeiture of goods for his role in the Conspiracy of Nobles (1632).

April
 15 April – Duke of Aarschot arrested in Madrid.
 29 April – Marquis of Aytona decrees amnesty for 1632 conspirators.

May
 23 May – Gaspard Nemius appointed bishop of Antwerp.

July
 5 July – Estates General, in session since 7 September 1632, disbanded by order of Philip IV of Spain.

November
 4 November – Joyous Entry into Brussels of Cardinal-Infante Ferdinand of Austria as new governor general.

Publications
 Jean-Jacques Courvoisier, Le sacré mausolée ou Les parfums exhalants du tombeau de la Serenissime Princesse Isabelle-Claire-Eugénie (Brussels, François Vivien), available on Google Books.
 Christophorus van Essen, Den waerom? Den Daerom. De exempelen ende waerheyt met eene voorstellinge ende beklach des oorloghs (Antwerp, Hendrik Aertssens), dedicated to Johannes Chrysostomus vander Sterre. The author is identified as "fencing master in Antwerp".
 Franciscus Piroulle, Oratio funebris in obitum augustae et felicis memoriae Isabellae Clarae Eugeniae Hispaniarum infantis, Belgarum principis, habita Brugis in aede D. Donatani XI. Januarii MDCXXXIV (Bruges, Nicolaes Breyghel), available on Google Books.
 Jean Puget de la Serre, Mausolee erige a la memoire d'Isabelle-Claire-Eugenie (Brussels, Jean Pepermans). Available from Google Books
 Erycius Puteanus, Historiae barbaricae libri VI, qui irruptiones barbarorum in Italiam, occasum Imperii, et res Insubrum continent (Antwerp, Joannes Cnobbaert), available on Google Books
 Juan Francisco Rodriguez, Nieuwen dictionaris om te leeren de Nederlandtsche ende Spaensche talen: met groote neerstigheydt by een vergadert ende ghestelt met de nomina, genera, verba ende eenighe coniugatien (Antwerp, Caesar Joachim Trognaesius) – A Dutch-Spanish dictionary and grammar. Available on Google Books
 Jean de Wachtendonck, Oratio funebris Isabellae Clarae Eugeniae Hispaniarum infantis (Brussels, Jean Pepermans).

Works of art
 Anthony van Dyck 
 Magistrates of Brussels (destroyed 1695)
 Deposition (Alte Pinakothek)

Births
Date uncertain
 Jan-Erasmus Quellinus, painter (died 1715)
 Pieter van der Willigen, painter (died 1694)

February
 27 February – Peter van de Velde, painter (died after 1723)

May
 9 May – Lievin Cruyl, priest-architect (died before 1720)

Deaths
Date uncertain
 John Heigham (born c. 1568), printer
 Philippe de Momper (born 1598), painter

February
 6 February – Floris Van der Haer (born 1547), historian

August
 9 August – Pieter de Jode I (born 1570), printmaker

November
 23 November – Wenceslas Cobergher (born 1560), architect and economist

December
 19 December – George Chamberlain (born 1576), bishop of Ypres

References